Den Dolder is a village in the Dutch province of Utrecht. It is a part of the municipality of Zeist, and lies about 4 km northeast of Bilthoven. Den Dolder has a railway station on the route between Amersfoort and Utrecht and is best known for its mental institutions such as Dennendal and the Willem Arntz Hoeve. Den Dolder also houses the big Dutch sauce manufacturer Remia referring to Den Dolder as Holland's Heart of Sauces as is depicted on the factory's side and is visible from the train passing by.

Transportation
The village is served by Den Dolder railway station.

Gallery

References

Populated places in Utrecht (province)
Zeist